Munimadugu is a small village in Anantapur district of Andhra Pradesh, India.

References 

Villages in Anantapur district